Marishda is a village, in Contai III CD block in Contai subdivision of Purba Medinipur district in the state of West Bengal, India.

Geography

Police station
Marishda police station has jurisdiction over Contai III CD block. It covers an area of 155.52 km2 with a population of  133,079. It is located at Marishda Bazar.

CD block HQ
The headquarters of Contai III CD block are located at Marishda.

Urbanisation
93.55% of the population of Contai subdivision live in the rural areas. Only 6.45% of the population live in the urban areas and it is considerably behind Haldia subdivision in urbanization, where 20.81% of the population live in urban areas.

Note: The map alongside presents some of the notable locations in the subdivision. All places marked in the map are linked in the larger full screen map.

Demographics
As per 2011 Census of India Marishda had a total population of 5,953 of which 3,049 (51%) were males and 2,904 (49%) were females. Population below 6 years was 619. The total number of literates in Marishda was 4,571 (85.70% of the population over 6 years).

Transport
SH 4 connecting Jhalda (in Purulia district) and Digha (in Purba Medinipur district) passes through Marishda.

References

Villages in Purba Medinipur district